Where Is Mr. Kim is a South Korean television program that airs on tvN. Before starting out as a regular variety show, 2 pilot episodes were aired on 7 and 8 October at 19:40 (KST).

Season 1 was broadcast on every Saturday at 19:40 (KST) from 18 November 2017 to 23 December 2017.

On 1 February 2018, it was announced that Season 2 of the show has been confirmed, with Lee Sang-min and Jeong Hyeong-don to remain while mixed martial artist Kim Dong-hyun and Girls' Generation's Hyoyeon will replace Season 1 regular cast Jeong Jin-woon and DinDin. It will be on broadcast every Thursday at 20:10 (KST) from 1 March 2018.

Program
Where Is Mr.Kim is South Korea's first ever infiltration mystery variety show where unknown actors/actresses showcase themselves with their acting skills. In each episode, the instigator, which is usually an experienced and more known actor/actress, will bring in a few unknown actors/actresses that are juniors to the instigator. The instigator will set up a situated theme and these unknown actors/actresses will blend in to it with other people who are genuinely based on it. The cast of star investigators will together experience the theme with the group and identify who are the actors/actresses among the group. If the cast cannot find all the unknown actors/actresses, the instigator wins the game.

In Season 2, the instigator will no longer be of an experienced, more known actor/actress.

Cast
Lee Sang-min (Pilot episodes 1–2, Season 1-2)
Jeong Hyeong-don (Pilot episodes 1–2, Season 1-2)
Kim Dong-hyun (Season 2)
Hyoyeon (Girls' Generation) (Season 2)

Former
Sleepy (Pilot episode 1)
Jeong Jin-woon (Pilot episodes 1–2, Season 1)
DinDin (Pilot episode 2, Season 1)

Episodes

Pilot Episodes

Season 1

Season 2

Ratings
In the ratings below, the highest rating for the show will be in red, and the lowest rating for the show will be in blue each year.

Season 1

Season 2

References

External links
 

South Korean reality television series